Zen: Intergalactic Ninja is a 1993 video game from Konami. The game is based on the fictional character of the same name

Plot
Zen fights an alien villain known as Lord Contaminous, who is keen on harming the Earth's ecological environment.

Reception

Paisley Daily Express gave the game a score of 13 out of 20, stating: "It plays nicely enough and looks all right, but there's nothing new here" Power Unlimited gave a review score of 90% writing: "Zen is one of the best platform games for the Game Boy. There are versatile locations, many different enemies and cool action. The game's environmentally conscious theme also obliges you to recycle your Game Boy's spent batteries."

References

1993 video games
Konami games
Game Boy games
Nintendo Entertainment System games
Video games about ninja
Video games based on comics
Video games developed in Japan